The 2003 Algarve Cup is the tenth edition of the Algarve Cup, an invitational women's football tournament hosted annually by Portugal. It was held from fourteenth to twentieth day of March 2003.

The USA won the tournament defeating China, 2-0, in the final game.

Format
The twelve teams are divided into three groups that played a round-robin group stage, followed by one position play-off match for every team.

With 12 teams participating, the Algarve Cup format has been as follows: Groups A and B, containing the strongest ranked teams, are the only ones in contention to win the title. The group A and B winners contest the final - to win the Algarve Cup. The runners-up play for third place, and those that finish third in the groups play for fifth place.  The teams in Group C played for places 7–12. The winner of Group C played the team that finished fourth in Group A or B (whichever has the better record) for seventh place. The Group C runner-up played the team who finishes last in Group A or B (with the worse record) for ninth place. The third and fourth placed teams in Group C played for the eleventh place.

Points awarded in the group stage followed the standard formula of three points for a win, one point for a draw and zero point for a loss. In the case of two teams being tied in a group, their head-to-head result determined their place in the group.

Participating teams

Group stage

Group A

Group B

Group C

Placement play-offs

Eleventh place match

Ninth place match

Seventh place match

Fifth place match

Third place match

Final

Final standings

Goal scorers

References

External links
Algarve Cup on WomensSoccerUnited.com
RSSSF.com history page, with links to full results

2003
Algarve Cup
Alg
March 2003 sports events in Europe
2003 in Portuguese women's sport